Henry Wilson Savage (March 21, 1859 – November 29, 1927) was an American theatrical manager.

Biography
Henry W. Savage was born March 21, 1859, in New Durham, New Hampshire. He graduated from Harvard in 1880. He became president of the Henry W. Savage Company, Inc., and of the Castle Square Opera Company of Boston, and director of the National Association of Theatrical Producing Managers of America.

Productions

Savage's more notable productions include the following:
The Prince of Pilsen
The Girl of the Golden West
The Merry Widow
The College Widow
The County Chairman
The Chocolate Soldier
Madama Butterfly (the first American performance in 1906)
Toot-Toot (1917) – featuring "The Last Long Mile"
Everywoman (1913–14)
Mr. Wu (1914)
Lass O'Laughter starring Flora Le Breton in 1925, Savage's last production in New York

Savage died in Boston on November 29, 1927.

In the 1953 memoir Bring On the Girls! (by P. G. Wodehouse and Guy Bolton), he is depicted as an extraordinarily manipulative and money-grubbing entrepreneur.

References

External links

 
 
 

Businesspeople from New York City
Harvard University alumni
American theatre managers and producers
1859 births
1927 deaths
19th-century American businesspeople
People from New Durham, New Hampshire